Glycine (soybean or soya bean) is a genus in the bean family Fabaceae.  The best known species is the cultivated soybean (Glycine max).  While the majority of the species are found only in Australia, the soybean's native range is in East Asia.  A few species extend from Australia to East Asia (e.g., G. tomentella and G. tabacina).

Glycine species are used as food plants by the larvae of some Lepidoptera species: the engrailed, nutmeg and turnip moths have all been recorded on soybean.

Species
Subgenus Glycine

Glycine albicans Tindale & Craven
Glycine aphyonota B.E.Pfeil
Glycine arenaria Tindale
Glycine argyrea Tindale
Glycine canescens F.J.Herm.
Glycine clandestina J.C.Wendl.
Glycine curvata Tindale
Glycine cyrtoloba Tindale
Glycine falcata Benth.
Glycine gracei B.E.Pfeil & Craven
Glycine hirticaulis Tindale & Craven
Glycine hirticaulis subsp. leptosa B.E.Pfeil
Glycine lactovirens Tindale & Craven
Glycine latifolia (Benth.) C.Newell & Hymowitz
Glycine latrobeana (Meissner) Benth.
Glycine microphylla (Benth.) Tindale
Glycine montis-douglas B.E.Pfeil & Craven
Glycine peratosa B.E.Pfeil & Tindale
Glycine pescadrensis Hayata
Glycine pindanica Tindale & Craven
Glycine pullenii B.E.Pfeil, Tindale & Craven
Glycine remota M.D.Barrett & R.L.Barrett
Glycine rubiginosa Tindale & B.E.Pfeil
Glycine stenophita B.E.Pfeil & Tindale
Glycine syndetika B.E.Pfeil & Craven
Glycine tabacina (Labill.) Benth.
Glycine tomentella Hayata

Subgenus Soja (Moench) F.J. Herm.

Glycine soja Sieb. & Zucc.
Glycine max (L.) Merr. (the soybean)

References
Genus Glycine Willd., Plants Database, US Department of Agriculture, Natural Resources Conservation Service

Recent taxonomic references
Barrett, R. L. and M. D. Barrett. (2015). Twenty-seven new species of vascular plants from Western Australia. Nuytsia 26, 21–87.
Pfeil, B. E., et al. (2006). Three new species of northern Australian Glycine (Fabaceae, Phaseolae), G. gracei, G. montis-douglas and G. syndetika. Australian Systematic Botany 19, 245–258.
Pfeil, B. E. and L. A. Craven. (2002). New taxa in Glycine (Fabaceae: Phaseoleae) from north-western Australia. Australian Systematic Botany 15, 565–573.
Pfeil, B. E., et al. (2001). A review of the Glycine clandestina species complex (Fabaceae, Phaseoleae) reveals two new species. Australian Systematic Botany 14, 891–900.
Pfeil, B. E. and M. D. Tindale. (2001). Glycine. in Flora of NSW, revised edition. Vol. 2. Harden, G. (ed.). Sydney, NSW University Press.
Doyle, J. J., et al. (2000). Confirmation of shared and divergent genomes in the Glycine tabacina polyploid complex (Leguminosae) using histone H3-D sequences. Systematic Botany 25, 437–448.
Tindale, M. D. and L. A. Craven. (1993). Glycine pindanica (Fabaceae: Phaseolae), a new species from west Kimberley, Western Australia. Australian Systematic Botany 6, 371–376.
Tindale, M. D. and L. A. Craven. (1988). Three new species of Glycine (Fabaceae: Phaseolae) from North-western Australia, with notes on amphicarpy in the genus. Australian Systematic Botany 1, 399–410.
Tindale, M. D. (1986). Taxonomic notes on three Australian and Norfolk Island species of Glycine Willd. (Fabaceae: Phaseolae) including the choice of a neotype for G. clandestina Wendl. Brunonia 9, 179–191.
Tindale, M. D. (1984). Two new eastern Australian species of Glycine Willd. (Fabaceae). Brunonia 7, 207–213.
Newell, C. A. and T. Hymowitz. (1980). A taxonomic revision on the genus Glycine subgenus Glycine (Leguminosae). Brittonia 32, 63–69.
Hermann, F. J. (1962). A revision of the genus Glycine and its immediate allies. Tech. Bull. U.S.D.A. 1268.

Older taxonomic references
Hayata. (1920). Ic. Pl. Formos. 9: 29.
Bentham, G. (1864). Glycine. Fl. Austral. 2: 242–245.

Citations

 
Phaseoleae
Fabaceae genera
Taxa named by Carl Ludwig Willdenow
Fabales of Asia